Menestho is a genus of snail.

Menestho (Μενεσθώ) may also refer to:

Menestho (mythology), one of the Oceanides
Menestho, one of the sacrificial victims of Minotaur